62 Sagittarii is a single, variable star in the constellation of Sagittarius. It has the Bayer designation c Sagittarii and the variable star designation V3872 Sagittarii, while 62 Sagittarii is its Flamsteed designation. This object forms the southwest corner of the asterism called the Terebellum. It is visible to the naked eye with an apparent visual magnitude that varies between 4.45 and 4.64, and, at its peak, it is the brightest of the four stars in the Terebellum. 62 Sagittarii is the star in the Terebellum which is most distant from its centre; it is 1.72° from its northwest corner, 60 Sagittarii, and 1.37° from its southeast corner, 59 Sagittarii. This star is located approximately 450 light-years from the Sun based on parallax, and is drifting further away with a radial velocity of +10 km/s.

This is an aging red giant with a stellar classification of M4.5III, a star that has exhausted the supply of hydrogen at its core and expanded to around 72 times the Sun's radius. It is a slow irregular variable with multiple pulsation periods. The star is radiating about 1,100 times the luminosity of the Sun from its swollen photosphere at an effective temperature of 3,915 K.

References

M-type giants
Slow irregular variables

Sagittarius (constellation)
Sagittarii, c
CD-28 16355
Sagittarii, 62
189763
098688
7650
Sagittarii, V3872